In the mathematics of probability, a stochastic process is a random function. In practical applications, the domain over which the function is defined is a time interval (time series) or a region of space (random field).

Familiar examples of time series include stock market and exchange rate fluctuations, signals such as speech, audio and video; medical data such as a patient's EKG, EEG, blood pressure or temperature; and random movement such as Brownian motion or random walks.

Examples of random fields include static images, random topographies (landscapes), or composition variations of an inhomogeneous material.

Stochastic processes topics

This list is currently incomplete. See also :Category:Stochastic processes

 Basic affine jump diffusion  
 Bernoulli process: discrete-time processes with two possible states.
 Bernoulli schemes: discrete-time processes with N possible states; every stationary process in N outcomes is a Bernoulli scheme, and vice versa. 
 Bessel process
 Birth–death process  
 Branching process  
 Branching random walk  
 Brownian bridge  
 Brownian motion  
 Chinese restaurant process  
 CIR process  
 Continuous stochastic process  
 Cox process  
Dirichlet processes
 Finite-dimensional distribution  
 First passage time
 Galton–Watson process  
 Gamma process  
 Gaussian process   – a process where all linear combinations of coordinates are normally distributed random variables.
 Gauss–Markov process   (cf. below)
GenI process
Girsanov's theorem 
Hawkes process  
Homogeneous processes: processes where the domain has some symmetry and the finite-dimensional probability distributions also have that symmetry. Special cases include stationary processes, also called time-homogeneous.
 Karhunen–Loève theorem
 Lévy process  
 Local time (mathematics)  
 Loop-erased random walk  
 Markov processes are those in which the future is conditionally independent of the past given the present.
 Markov chain  
 Markov chain central limit theorem  
 Continuous-time Markov process  
 Markov process  
 Semi-Markov process  
 Gauss–Markov processes: processes that are both Gaussian and Markov
Martingales – processes with constraints on the expectation 
 Onsager–Machlup function  
 Ornstein–Uhlenbeck process  
 Percolation theory  
Point processes: random arrangements of points in a space . They can be modelled as stochastic processes where the domain is a sufficiently large family of subsets of S, ordered by inclusion; the range is the set of natural numbers; and, if A is a subset of B, ƒ(A) ≤ ƒ(B) with probability 1.
 Poisson process  
 Compound Poisson process  
 Population process  
 Probabilistic cellular automaton  
 Queueing theory  
 Queue  
 Random field  
 Gaussian random field  
 Markov random field  
 Sample-continuous process  
 Stationary process  
 Stochastic calculus  
 Itô calculus  
 Malliavin calculus  
 Semimartingale  
 Stratonovich integral  
 Stochastic control  
 Stochastic differential equation  
 Stochastic process  
 Telegraph process  
 Time series  
 Wald's martingale  
 Wiener process  

Mathematics-related lists
List
Statistics-related lists